Aguata is a Local Government Area in Anambra State in Nigeria, with its headquarters in Aguata (location of the headquarters office buildings), a major part of which falls into Aguluezechukwu, while the smallest part falls within the commercial town of Ekwulobia. There has been an age-long contention on this issue between the locals of Aguluezechukwu and Ekwulobia, with both towns claiming the status of the headquarters on account of ownership claim to the 'Aguata land'. This state of affairs caused the Government of Anambra State to officially declare that the headquarters of Aguata Local Government Area should be Aguata (the neutral name of the location in which the headquarters of Aguata Local Government Area Offices are sited) in a bid to settle the conflict.

Ekwulobia

Ekwulobia, the largest town in Aguata, is expanding rapidly to a population of about 100,000 people. It is the major commercial town in the area. Most Nigerian commercial banks maintain their branches there. It also boasts a small sized stadium, a federal prison (part of which falls into Ezinifite), and a major market, Eke Market. Several new agricultural factories established around Ekwulobia town have also attracted workers. Ekwulobia is also a major transit hub from which travellers can connect to other far-flung cities in Nigeria. There is public transport that runs from Ekwulobia daily to Onitsha, Nnewi, Awka, Port Harcourt, Lagos, Abuja, Enugu, and Abakaliki, among other places.

In the area of hospitality business, the town has a few hotels, such as Orthon Palace Hotels, and in recent times, the Chicago Hotel, Vonic Hotel and resort, and Logart Hills Hotel. All these and many other features have made Ekwulobia attractive to visitors.

Ekwulobia People's Assembly is the mother union of all branches of Ekwulobia People's meetings, both at home and abroad, even among the diaspora, with the Lagos branch being the strongest of all the unions.

Other towns in Aguata L.G.A
 Ekwulobia
 Akpo
 Achina
 Uga
 Igbo-Ukwu
 Isuofia
 Umuchu
 Aguluezechukwu
 Ezinifite
 Ikenga
 Amesi
 Oraeri
 Umuona
 Nkpologwu

Prominent natives 
 Chukwuma Soludo – economics professor and former governor and chairman of the board of directors of the Central Bank of Nigeria. He is the incumbent governor of Anambra State.
 Chukwuemeka Ezeife – former Governor of Anambra State
 Eucharia Okwunna – former representative for Aguata in the Nigerian House of Representatives

Culture
The famous 'Awuka' masquerade of Aguluezechukwu and 'Nkpokiti Ije Enu Dance' are noted for their unique dance steps and have won accolades in Anambra State.

References

External links
 Aguata Local Government website

Local Government Areas in Anambra State
Local Government Areas in Igboland